The McLaren MP4-X is a concept car produced by the McLaren Formula 1 team in 2015. It was introduced in order reduce the impact of F1 track accidents on the driver. This car's successful testing phases paved the way for the creation of the McLaren X2.

References

Concept cars
MP4-X